The Duty on Hair Powder Act 1795 (35 Geo. III, c. 49) was an Act of the Parliament of Great Britain which levied a tax on hair powder. The tax was used to finance government programs, especially to fund the Revolutionary and Napoleonic Wars with France. The Act was repealed in 1869.

The Act 
Certain exemptions were included: the Royal Family and their servants; clergymen with an income of under £100 a year; and members of the armed forces who were privates in the army, artillery soldiers, mariners, engineers, non-commissioned officers, subalterns, officers in the navy below commander, yeomanry, militia, fencibles, and volunteers. A father with more than two unmarried daughters could buy two certificates that would be valid for any number he stated at the stamp office. The master of a household could buy a certificate for a number of his servants, and that certificate would also be valid for their successors within that year. 

Substantial fines could be imposed on those brought before the courts.

Effects 
The Hair Powder Certificates, etc. Act 1795 (35 Geo. III, c. 112) was passed later in the same session of Parliament to allow people more time to apply for certificates.

The use of hair powder had been declining and the tax hastened its near death. In its first year, the tax raised £200,000. In 1812, 46,684 people still paid the tax. In 1855, only 997 did and almost all of these were servants. By the time it was repealed in 1869, it yielded an annual revenue of £1,000.

According to author Jenny Uglow, those who chose to pay the guinea hair powder tax were nicknamed "guinea-pigs" by reformist Whigs who chose instead to cut their hair short (the "French" cut) and go without a wig as an expression of solidarity with the French. Those deriding hair-powder taxpayers as "guinea-pigs" were, in turn, satirized by The Times as members of the "Crop Club" wearing the "Bedford Level", a reference to prominent Whig reformer John Russell, 4th Duke of Bedford.

References

Repealed Great Britain Acts of Parliament
Tax legislation in the United Kingdom
Great Britain Acts of Parliament 1795